Galindo y Perahuy is a village and municipality in the province of Salamanca, in western Spain, part of the autonomous community of Castile-Leon.

Geography 

Transport 
The village is connected via the A-62 highway to Portugal.

Lately the population has been increasing due to nearby residential developments like "La RAD". Nevertheless people living there are linked mainly to Salamanca and not to Galindo y Perahuy.

See also
List of municipalities in Salamanca

References

Municipalities in the Province of Salamanca